Kar Ashub (also Romanized as Kar Āshūb; also known as Karāshb and Karāshū) is a village in Rostam-e Yek Rural District, in the Central District of Rostam County, Fars Province, Iran. At the 2006 census, its population was 164, in 34 families.

References 

Populated places in Rostam County